The 2018 Lima Challenger was a professional tennis tournament played on clay courts. It was the twelfth edition of the tournament which was part of the 2018 ATP Challenger Tour. It took place in Lima, Peru between October 22 and October 27, 2018.

Singles main-draw entrants

Seeds

 1 Rankings are as of 15 October 2018.

Other entrants
The following players received wildcards into the singles main draw:
  Nicolás Álvarez
  Emilio Gómez
  Kento Tagashira
  Juan Pablo Varillas

The following player received entry into the singles main draw using a protected ranking:
  Santiago Giraldo

The following player received entry into the singles main draw as an alternate:
  Miljan Zekić

The following players received entry from the qualifying draw:
  Marcelo Tomás Barrios Vera
  Andrea Collarini
  Renzo Olivo
  Cristian Rodríguez

Champions

Singles

  Christian Garín def.  Pedro Sousa 6–4, 6–4.

Doubles

  Guido Andreozzi /  Guillermo Durán def.  Ariel Behar /  Gonzalo Escobar 2–6, 7–6(7–5), [10–5].

References

2018 ATP Challenger Tour
2018
October 2018 sports events in South America
2018 in Peruvian sport